Freddy Ovett (born 16 January 1994) is a British-born Australian cyclist, who currently rides for UCI Continental team . He has previously been a stagiaire with UCI WorldTeam  in 2018, and UCI Professional Continental team  in 2019.

Personal life
Ovett was born in Dumfries, Scotland. His father, Steve Ovett, competed for Great Britain in middle-distance running during the 1970s and the 1980s; he won gold medals at the 1980 Summer Olympics in the 800 metres, and the 1986 Commonwealth Games in the 5000 metres. Ovett himself also competed as a runner before cycling and still occasionally does, having completed the 2021 Los Angeles Marathon in a time of 2:48:55 and the Sant Silvestre de Girona 5k in 14:41.

His uncle, Nick Ovett, competed for Great Britain in the luge at the 1988 and 1992 Winter Olympics.

Major results
2018
 2nd Tour de Okinawa
 7th Overall Tour de Tochigi
 10th Overall Herald Sun Tour
2019
 9th Overall Tour de Langkawi
2020
 8th UCI Esports World Championships
2022
 2nd  UCI Esports World Championships

References

External links

1994 births
Living people
Australian male cyclists
Sportspeople from Dumfries
Australian male long-distance runners
Australian people of Scottish descent